Acta Scientiarum Mathematicarum is a Hungarian mathematical journal published by the János Bolyai Mathematical Institute (University of Szeged). It was established by Alfréd Haar and Frigyes Riesz in 1922. The current editor-in-chief is Lajos Molnár. The journal is abstracted and indexed in Scopus and Zentralblatt MATH.

References

External links
 
 

Mathematics journals
Publications established in 1922